In military terms, 61st Division, 61st Infantry Division, or 61st Cavalry Division may refer to:

Infantry divisions
61st (2nd South Midland) Division, United Kingdom
61st Infantry Division (United Kingdom) 
61st Infantry Division (France)
61st Infantry Division (Wehrmacht)
61st Division (Imperial Japanese Army)
61st Infantry Division Sirte, Kingdom of Italy

Cavalry divisions
 61st Cavalry Division (Soviet Union)
 61st Cavalry Division (United States)

See also 
 List of military divisions by number